Europium(II) bromide is a crystalline compound of one europium atom and two bromine atoms. Europium(II) bromide is a white powder at room temperature, and odorless. Europium dibromide is hygroscopic.

Reactions
Europium(II) bromide is known to be involved in three reactions:
                              
2 EuBr3 + Eu → 3 EuBr2 (requires a temperature of 800-900 °C)
2 EuBr3 → 2 EuBr2 + Br2 (requires a temperature of 900-1000 °C)
Eu + HgBr2 → EuBr2 + Hg (requires a temperature of 700-800 °C)

References

Bromides
Europium(II) compounds
Lanthanide halides